Leopoldina may refer to:

 Colônia Leopoldina, a Brazilian municipality in the state of Alagoa
 Leopoldina, Minas Gerais, a Brazilian municipality in the state of Minas Gerais
 Maria Leopoldina of Austria (1797-1826), consort of emperor Pedro I of Brazil
 Princess Leopoldina of Brazil (1847-1871), an archduchess of Austria, Empress consort of Brazil and Queen consort of Portugal.
 Leopoldina, a steamship originally named Blücher, renamed after being seized by the Brazilian government
 The Academy of Sciences Leopoldina, Germany's national scientific academy
 The asteroid 893 Leopoldina
 Leopoldina, a former German name for the University of Breslau
Leopoldina Hering, 1934, a junior synonym of the moth genus Amata Fabricius